"As-Salam al-Malaki" (literally "The Royal Salute") was the former national anthem of Kingdom of Iraq from 1924 to 1958.

History

It was composed by Iraqi Army Band director Lieutenant A. Chaffon in 1924, a British military officer.

See also

"Ardulfurataini", the former Iraqi national anthem, used from 1981 to 2003.
"Mawtini", the current Iraqi national anthem since 2003.

References

External links
MP3 file

Asian anthems
Iraqi monarchy
Iraqi music
National symbols of Iraq
Royal anthems
Year of song unknown